Tinto is the highest in the Tinto Hills in southern Scotland.

Tinto may also refer to:

 Tinto River, in south-western Andalusia, Spain
 An area of Honduras sometimes counted as part of the Mosquito Coast
 A fictional city in the computer game series Suikoden
 Tinto Fino, a black grape variety native to Spain
 An alternative name for wines made from the Grenache grape
 Tinto Brass (born 1933), Italian film director and screenwriter

See also
 Rio Tinto (disambiguation)